This is a list of members of the Australian House of Representatives from 1998 to 2001, as elected at the 1998 election.

 The Labor member for Holt (VIC), Gareth Evans, resigned on 30 September 1999; Labor candidate Anthony Byrne won the resulting by-election on 6 November.
 The Labor member for Isaacs (VIC), Greg Wilton, died on 14 June 2000; Labor candidate Ann Corcoran won the resulting by-election on 12 August.
 Andrew Theophanous, the member for Calwell (VIC), resigned from the Labor party on 18 October 2000, serving for the remainder of his term as an independent.
 Liberal member John Moore, member for the western Brisbane seat of Ryan, resigned on 5 February 2001; Labor candidate Leonie Short won the resulting by-election on 17 March.
 Liberal member Peter Nugent, member for Aston (VIC), died on 24 April 2001; Liberal candidate Chris Pearce won the resulting by-election on 14 July.

References

Members of Australian parliaments by term
21st-century Australian politicians
20th-century Australian politicians